The 2010 MTV Movie Awards was the 19th annual ceremony which took place on June 6, 2010, at the Gibson Amphitheatre in Universal City, California. Aziz Ansari served as a host for the ceremony. Voting the nominees began from a list of eligible contestants on March 29, 2010, and ended on April 9, 2010. The nominees itself were announced on May 12, 2010, and the winners were voted by the public.

MTV, MTV2, and VH1 all broadcast the ceremony simultaneously; the three networks combined for a viewership of 5.8 million, down from 5.9 million viewers last year.

The show has gained some controversy for constantly using the term "fuck" and its derivatives by its presenters and Peter Facinelli, who accepted the Best Movie award. A number of them were not muted because of its live broadcast. Parents Television Council president Tim Winter, responding to the program's TV-14 rating, stated: "It is an outrage to the content rating system. If it had been a motion picture, it would have been rated R. The fact that it was rated 14 shows what little respect MTV and Viacom have for the content ratings."

Performers 
 Ed Helms, Ken Jeong, Tom Cruise (as his Tropic Thunder, character Les Grossman), and Jennifer Lopez — Dance Medley of Jennifer Lopez's Get Right and Ludacris's Get Back
 Katy Perry and Snoop Dogg — "California Gurls"
 Christina Aguilera — Medley: "Bionic/Not Myself Tonight/Woohoo"

Presenters 
 Adam Sandler, Kevin James, Chris Rock, David Spade, and Rob Schneider — presented Best Female Performance
 Jonah Hill, Russell Brand, and Sean "Diddy" Combs — presented Best Breakout Star
 Steve Carell and Paul Rudd — presented Best Scared-As-Shit Performance
 Bradley Cooper and Jessica Biel — presented Best Kiss
 Jason Segel and Miranda Cosgrove — introduced Katy Perry and Snoop Dogg
 Betty White, Bradley Cooper, and Scarlett Johansson — presented MTV Generation Award
 Michael Cera, Kieran Culkin, Anna Kendrick, and Aubrey Plaza — presented Best WTF Moment
 Samuel L. Jackson, Eva Mendes, Dwayne Johnson, Mark Wahlberg, and Will Ferrell — presented Best Villain
 Jackie Chan, Jaden Smith, and Shaun White — presented Biggest Badass Star
 Jessica Alba and Vanessa Hudgens — presented Best Male Performance
 Christopher Mintz-Plasse and Ed Helms — introduced Christina Aguilera
 Zac Efron — presented Best Comedic Performance
 Cameron Diaz and Tom Cruise — presented Best Movie

Awards

MTV Generation Award
 Sandra Bullock

Notable moments 
 When Robert Pattinson and Kristen Stewart won the best kiss, they repeated the same performance back on MTVMA 2009, promising a kiss in front of the fans. Kristen at first tried to leave the fans hanging, but Robert stole a kiss from her.
 When Sandra Bullock won MTV Generation, she discussed her divorce and the fact that no one needed to worry about, and after that, she kissed Scarlett Johansson.

Sneak Peeks 
 Harry Potter and the Deathly Hallows
 The Twilight Saga: Eclipse
 The Last Airbender
 Scott Pilgrim vs. the World
 Jersey Shore (season 2)

References

External links 
 MTV Movie Awards official site
 

MTV Movie & TV Awards
MTV Movie Awards
MTV Movie
2010 in Los Angeles
2010 in American cinema